Psamatodes trientata is a species of geometrid moth in the family Geometridae. It is found in the Caribbean Sea, Central America, and North America.

The MONA or Hodges number for Psamatodes trientata is 6332.1.

References

Further reading

 

Macariini
Articles created by Qbugbot
Moths described in 1870